The 2016 United Bowl was the championship game of the 2016 Indoor Football League season. It was played between the Intense Conference Champion Spokane Empire and the United Conference Champion Sioux Falls Storm. The game was played at Denny Sanford Premier Center in Sioux Falls, South Dakota.

This was the Sioux Falls Storm's sixth United Bowl championship and seventh overall United Bowl appearance. It was the Spokane Empire's first United Bowl appearance.

Venue
The game was played at Denny Sanford Premier Center in Sioux Falls, South Dakota, as the Sioux Falls Storm had the home field advantage by cause of having a better regular season record.

Background

Spokane Empire

On September 1, 2015, the Spokane Shock left the Arena Football League for the IFL. They changed their names to the Empire, as the AFL owned the rights to the Shock name. The Empire finished the season with a conference best 12–4, earning the first seed in the Intense Conference and a first round bye. In the conference championship, they defeated the Nebraska Danger at home in a 55–44 contest.

Sioux Falls Storm

In 2016, the Storm began the regular season with four straight wins before their first road-bump in a loss to the Cedar Rapids Titans. They rebounded from that loss with eleven consecutive victories to finish the season with a 15–1 record, and first place in the United Conference. Sioux Falls clinched home field advantage and a first round bye due to their conference finish. In the conference championship, they defeated the Cedar Rapids Titans at home by a score of 54–28.

Box score

References

2016 Indoor Football League season
Sioux Falls Storm
Spokane Empire
United Bowl
2016 in sports in South Dakota
Sports competitions in South Dakota
July 2016 sports events in the United States